is a city located in Fukui Prefecture, Japan. , the city had an estimated population of 27,107 in 10,140 households and the population density of 232 persons per km². It is one of the few Hiragana cities in Japan. Awara is a city famous for its onsen resorts and natural hotwater springs.

Geography
Awara is located in far northern Fukui Prefecture, bordered by Ishikawa Prefecture to the north and the Sea of Japan to the northeast, The city of Sakai surrounds the city to the east, south and west.

Neighbouring municipalities 
Fukui Prefecture
Sakai
Ishikawa Prefecture
Kaga

Climate
Awara has a Humid climate (Köppen Cfa) characterized by warm, wet summers and cold winters with heavy snowfall.  The average annual temperature in Awara is 14.2 °C. The average annual rainfall is 2481 mm with September as the wettest month. The temperatures are highest on average in August, at around 26.8 °C, and lowest in January, at around 2.8 °C.

Demographics
Per Japanese census data, the population of Awara peaked around the year 2000 and has declined since.

History
Awara is part of ancient Echizen Province. During the Edo period, the area was divided between the holdings of Fukui Domain, Maruoka Domain and Nishio Domain. Following the Meiji restoration, it was organised into part of Sakai District in Fukui Prefecture. Awara Onsen was developed from June 1884. With the establishment of the modern municipalities system on April 1, 1889, the town of Kanazu and villages of Awara, Ii, Tsuboe, Hosorogi, Yoshizaki, Kitagata and Honjō were established. Awara was raised to town status in February 1935. The villages of Ii, Tsuboe, Hosoroe, and Yoshizaki merged into Kanazu in October 1954, and Kitagata and Honsho were merged into Awara in March 1955. Most of Awara Onsen burned down in a fire in April 1956. Awara and Kanazu merged to form the city of Awara on March 1, 2004.

Government
Awara has a mayor-council form of government with a directly elected mayor and a unicameral city legislature of 18 members.

Economy
The economy of Awara is mixed, with agriculture and the tourism industry centered on Awara Onsen playing prominent roles. Hitachi Zosen Fukui Corporation, a hydraulic press manufacturer, is headquartered in Awara.

Education
Awara has seven public elementary schools and two middle schools operated by the city government, and one public high school operated by the Fukui Prefectural Board of Education.

High school
 Kanazu High School (金津高校）

Junior high schools
 Awara Junior High School (芦原中学校)
 Kanazu Junior High School (金津中学校)

Elementary schools
 Awara Elementary School (芦原小学校)
 Kitagata Elementary School 北潟小学校)
 Kanazu Elementary School (金津小学校)
 Hosorogi Elementary School (細呂木小学校)
 Kanazu Higashi Elementary School (金津東小学校)
 Ii Elementary School (伊井小学校)
 Honjo Elementary School (本荘小学校)

Transportation

Railway
  JR West - Hokuriku Main Line
  Echizen Railway Mikuni Awara Line
  -  -

Highway

International relations 
 - Shaoxing, Zhejiang, China, friendship city

Local attractions
Echizen-Kaga Kaigan Quasi-National Park
Awara Onsen
site of Yoshizaki-gobō

References

External links

 

 
Cities in Fukui Prefecture
Populated coastal places in Japan